Charlie is a 2015 Indian Malayalam-language adventure drama film directed by Martin Prakkat and written by Prakkat and Unni R. Produced by Prakkat, Joju George and Shebin Becker, the film stars Dulquer Salmaan and Parvathy. The music is composed by Gopi Sundar, while Jomon T. John handles the cinematography. The film released on 24 December. It won 8 awards at the 46th Kerala State Film Awards, including Best Actor, Best Actress, Best Director and Best Cinematography. It was remade into Marathi and Tamil as Deva and Maara, respectively.

Plot
Tessa (Parvathy) is a graphic artist who runs away from home to avoid an unwanted matrimonial alliance. With the help of her journalist friend, she acquires a rented apartment in a dilapited house. Initially, she hates the tattered place, but soon she learns that the room was previously occupied by a carefree vagabond named Charlie (Dulquer). When she starts cleaning up, she discovers a photo and a graphic novel of this man. The sketches in the novel depict the events from the previous New Year's Eve when a small-time thief tried to rob the man's room. In a turn-of-events, the man joined him in his nightly theft routine and snuck up on the roof of another house. But there, they encountered something shocking that left them stunned.  The novel stops there abruptly with sketches of the dumbstruck faces of Charlie and the thief on the last page. This piques Tessa's curiosity about the rest of the story, as well as the previous occupant of the room.

Intrigued, Tessa starts looking for the people in the man's sketches. Backtracking his steps, she meets the man's "father" (who is more of a friend). She also comes across a boat servant named "Pathrose" who tells her the story of Mariya/Queen Mary. Mariya was a middle-aged woman, who was sexually exploited by her procurer husband from youth. Once, Charlie took out the now terminally ill Mariya to the sea at midnight with the help of Pathrose for her birthday. But Mariya jumped into the ocean to her death, that left Charlie stunned with shock and grief. Following up on more clues, Tessa gets news that Charlie is staying in a hotel and rushes to meet him. However, she misses him just by a few seconds. Later a helper boy in the hotel explains to her that Charlie had just rescued Mariya's daughter from her father's exploitation, after creating a ruckus.

Few days later, by the stroke of luck, Tessa meets the thief depicted in that man's sketches and inquiries about the rest of the story from New Year's eve. He tells her that on that day, they had encountered a young woman on the verge of suicide and his sir (Charlie) stopped her from hanging herself, after which she escaped from the scene on her bike. Tessa and the thief locate the woman's house and finally identify her as Dr. Kani from the latter's father. 

Tessa travels to Ooty to find Kani and inquires about her story. Kani explains that she was depressed over her broken relationship when she did her first independent operation, leading to the death of a 10-year-old girl. Further hooked by the media, she was desperate and about to commit suicide on new year eve when she was distracted by that man (Charlie). He brought her to a shelter home maintained by Kunjappan in Ooty and she has been living there since. Kunjappan, an old man, is a hopeless romantic who is waiting for his teenage love Thresia to show up.

Tessa spends good time in Ooty but her trip comes to an abrupt end as her brother and mother find her and take her home against her wishes. While a depressed Tessa is on her way back home, Charlie returns with Kunjappan's long lost love Thresia, who is a nun now, and they again miss each other by a few seconds. 

Later, Kani informs Charlie about Tessa, and he admits knowing about her and her search for him. Though initially reluctant for love, Charlie is forced to rethink after hearing Kunjappan and Kani. Next morning, he sneaks out early and informs Kani that he will be attending the Thrissur Pooram function, and Tessa can find him there if she's looking for him. 

Tessa reaches the Pooram grounds and finds him performing in a magic show.  Afterward, he spots her, approaches, and asks her if she wants to have some drink. At first, she introduces herself as Shruti Raman and lets him think that he has met the wrong person. But as the festival starts, Charlie's antics make her confess that she is indeed Tessa and he too reveals his name to be 'Charlie'. As the credits roll, they are seen wandering together towards a new journey in life.

Cast

 Dulquer Salmaan as Charlie
 Parvathy as Tessa
 Aparna Gopinath as Kani
 Nedumudi Venu as Kunjappan
 Chemban Vinod Jose as Mathai/Pathrose
 Kalpana as Queen Mary/ Mariya
 Soubin Shahir as Sunikuttan/ Mr. D'souza
 Neeraj Madhav as Ansari 
 P. Balachandran as Usman Ikka
 K.P.A.C.Lalitha as Rahel Ammachi
 Seetha as Tessa's mother
 Reshma Sebastian as Shahina (Tessa's friend)
 Master Minon as Balan Pillai/Room Boy
 Ramesh Pisharody as Sojan
 Jayaraj Warrier as Vaattu Jose
 Surjith as Aadu Abootty
 Renji Panicker as Panicker Doctor (guest appearance)
 Joy Mathew as Umer (guest appearance)
 Tovino Thomas as Georgy (guest appearance)
 Nassar as magician (guest appearance)
 Rajesh Sharma as Queen Mary's Husband

Remakes

Production
Principal photography began on 25 May 2015 in Idukki. IBTimes reported that it will be an experimental film and each actor will be spotted in a new look. The film was shot at various locations in Kochi, Munnar and Gujarat. The filming was completed by September 2015.

Music

The film's soundtrack was composed by Gopi Sunder and the lyrics were written by Rafeeq Ahamed and Santhosh Varma. The songs were released on 7 December 2015. "Chithirathira" sung by Vijay Yesudas was released separately on 21 December. A promotional video of Dulquer Salmaan singing "Chundari Penne" was released on 24 December.

Reception

Box office

The film collected 20 million on the first day from Kerala box office, and grossed 144 million in 22 days of release.
The film completed a 100-day theatrical run in Kerala and grossed 224.2 million at the Kerala box office. In its lifetime, Charlie grossed 420 million at the global box office.

Critical reception
Describing the film as a "tantalizing love tale", Vishnu Varma of The New Indian Express rated it 4 stars out of 5 and stated, "‘Charlie’ is a feel-good movie, but it does not stop there. It plays around brilliantly with raw emotions centered around a character who wants to be free."
Litty Simon of Malayala Manorama rated it 3.25 out of 5, concluding "Dulquer's Charlie is a simple, feel good film that will make you smile this festive season. Although not an out-and-out entertainer, Charlie has the elements to be tagged as a wacky entertainer, filled with all what is needed — celebration, surprises, patience, faith, care, and above, all love!" Website Nowrunning gave the film 2.5 stars out of 5, stating "Charlie could be termed an audacious attempt but grandiose visions don't necessarily translate into well-crafted cinema. Pared down expectations could make it a reasonable weekend watch."

Accolades

Notes

References

External links
 

2015 films
2010s Malayalam-language films
2015 romantic drama films
Indian romantic drama films
Films shot in Gujarat
Films shot in Kochi
Films shot in Munnar
Films scored by Gopi Sundar
Malayalam films remade in other languages
Films directed by Martin Prakkat
Films shot in Thrissur